Attorney General Cooper may refer to:

Charles Merian Cooper (1856–1923), Attorney General of Florida
Henry E. Cooper (1857–1929), Attorney General of the Kingdom of Hawaii
Pope Alexander Cooper (1848–1923), Attorney-General of Queensland
Robert E. Cooper Jr. (born 1957), Attorney General of Tennessee
Roy Cooper (born 1957), Attorney General of North Carolina

See also
General Cooper (disambiguation)